The 1912 Washington State football team was an American football team that represented Washington State College during the 1912 college football season. Led by fourth-year head coach John R. Bender, who returned after a four-year absence, Washington State compiled a record of 2–3.

Schedule

References

External links
 Official game program: Idaho at Washington State – October 18, 1912

Washington State
Washington State Cougars football seasons
Washington State football